Gilbert Gottlieb (22 October 1929 – 13 July 2006) was an American psychologist.

After receiving his bachelor's and master's degrees from the University of Miami, he received his Ph.D. in the psychology - zoology program at Duke University.  He observed the differences in bird development, by both observing egg hatching and manipulating variables important to bird development, including calls.  Gottlieb's major contribution to the field of psychology was his theory of probabilistic epigenesis, which explains that there is no predetermined path to trait development.  Gottlieb died 13 July 2006 in Raleigh, North Carolina, outlived by his wife, Nora Lee Willis Gottlieb, his children, Jonathan B.Gottlieb, Aaron L. Gottlieb, and Marc S. Gottlieb, and his grandchildren.

Life and career 

Gottlieb was born in Brooklyn, New York on 22 October 1929.

He received the Distinguished Scientific Contributions to Child Development Award from the Society of Research in Child Development in 1977.  in 1982 he was an Excellence Foundation Professor and Head of the Department of Psychology at the university of North Carolina at Greensboro.  After this he received his Ph.D. in Duke's joint psychology-zoology program, allowing him to further his research on birds.  In 1956 the Dorothea Dix Hospital opened as the "Insane Hospital of North Carolina"; Gottlieb was involved in the research section of the hospital. In 1983 he was elected a Fellow of the American Association for the Advancement of Science.
Gottlieb died July 13, 2006.

Research 
As a graduate student Gottlieb studied behavior imprinting of ducklings.  He noticed that duck eggs laid at the same time hatched at different times.  He expanded the research by Eckhard Hess by "plott[ing] the bird's responsiveness in terms of developmental age - the age from the beginning of embryonic development" (p. 446).  The problem that Gottlieb found with Hess' research is that he would not replicate what Hess called the "critical period" for imprinting.  The developmental age that Gottlieb measured characterized this "critical period" with an "appropriate" independent variable.  Gottlieb suggests that imprinting may be the result of a series of complex and subtle feedback processes.

Gottlieb continued his research involving birds by depriving mallard ducks of auditory sensory stimulation experienced in normal development.  He then exposed them to both chicken and mallard calls.  He found that instincts do not solely depend on experience, but influential social situations.

Gottlieb's major contribution to psychology was his theory of probabilistic epigenesis, which states that behavioral development does not have a predetermined course.  He described "experiential effects as facilitating, inducing, and maintaining development" (p. 163).

Publications 
(1991a). Experiential canalization of behavioral development: Theory. Developmental Psychology, 27, 4–13.
(1991b). Experiential canalization of behavioral development: Results. Developmental Psychology, 27, 35–39.
(2007). Probabilistic epigenesis. Developmental Science, 10, 1-11.
(1997). Synthesizing nature and nurture: Prenatal roots of instinctive behavior. Lawrence Erlbaum Associates.
With Krasnegor, N. A. (1985). Measurement of audition and vision in the first year of postnatal life. Ablex Publishing.
(1971). Development of species identification in birds: An inquiry into the prenatal determinants of perception. (1 ed.). Chicago: University of Chicago Press.
(1973). Behavioral embryology (studies on the development of behavior and the nervous system. (Vol. 1). Academic Press.
(1968). Prenatal behavior of birds. Quart Rev Biology.

References 

1929 births
2006 deaths
20th-century American psychologists
University of North Carolina at Greensboro faculty
University of Miami alumni
Duke University alumni
Fellows of the American Association for the Advancement of Science